Brit Awards 2005 was the 25th edition of the Brit Awards, an annual pop music awards ceremony in the United Kingdom, which for this edition was marketed as "Brits 25 - The 25th Show". The show was broadcast on the UK ITV network, and attracted 6.32 million viewers.

The producers added a fake film effect to the telecast of the 2005 awards show, which was criticised by some who thought ruined the immediacy of the awards show, and was dizzying when combined with fast camera movements.

The host was Chris Evans and the venue for the event was Earls Court.

Performances

Winners and nominees

Outstanding Contribution to Music
Bob Geldof

Multiple nominations and awards

See also
Naomi Awards

References

External links
Brit Awards 2005 at Brits.co.uk

Brit Awards
Brit Awards, 2005
Brit Awards, 2005
Brit Awards
Brit
Brit Awards